Dynamic Airlines was a small Dutch charter airline for business, medical and rapid small cargo flights and was founded in 1980, operating mainly from Rotterdam Airport. Their callsign was DYNAMIC, formerly DYNAMITE. In 2006, the airline ceased all operations.

Fleet
The fleet of Dynamic Airlines consisted of six aircraft, including:

Incidents and Accidents
 In September 2005, a Fairchild Metroliner registered PH-DYM of Dynamic Airlines ran off the runway at Rotterdam Airport during take-off causing the landing gear to collapse, leaving the aircraft badly damaged. There were no casualties, but the aircraft was written off.

External links
Airliners.net - Dynamic Airlines aircraft photos

Defunct airlines of the Netherlands
Airlines established in 1980
Airlines disestablished in 2006
Dutch companies established in 1980
Dutch companies disestablished in 2006